Persectania is a genus of moths of the family Noctuidae.

Species
 Persectania aulacias (Meyrick, 1887)
 Persectania aversa (Walker, 1856)
 Persectania dyscrita Common, 1954
 Persectania ewingii (Westwood, 1839)
 Persectania similis Philpott, 1924
 Persectania steropastis (Meyrick, 1887)

References
Natural History Museum Lepidoptera genus database
Persectania at funet

Hadeninae